Marcos Nahuel Roseti (born 3 August 1997) is an Argentine professional footballer who plays as a forward for Barracas Central.

Career
Roseti's career began with Barracas Central. He made his professional bow for the Primera B Metropolitana team on 14 November 2015 against Deportivo Riestra, coming off the bench after fifty minutes of an eventual 5–4 victory. Three further appearances followed in the 2016 season, though he didn't appear in the subsequent 2016–17. On 30 June 2017, Roseti joined Primera B Nacional's Sarmiento on loan. He remained for twelve months but didn't feature for their first-team. His next appearance for Barracas Central arrived in May 2019 versus All Boys.

Career statistics
.

Honours
Barracas Central
Primera B Metropolitana: 2018–19

References

External links

1997 births
Living people
Place of birth missing (living people)
Argentine footballers
Association football forwards
Primera B Metropolitana players
Barracas Central players
Club Atlético Sarmiento footballers